Montcalm Park Historic District is a national historic district located at Oswego in Oswego County, New York.  The district includes 28 contributing buildings, one contributing site, and three contributing structures.  The centerpiece of the district is Montcalm Park, a two-acre landscaped park dedicated in 1913.

It was listed on the National Register of Historic Places in 2001.

References

Historic districts on the National Register of Historic Places in New York (state)
Historic districts in Oswego County, New York
National Register of Historic Places in Oswego County, New York